Tocco Caudio is   a village and comune in the province of Benevento, in the Campania region of southern Italy. The old town was abandoned after a series of earthquakes in 1980 and 1981.

Geography

As with many ancient towns in this mountainous region of southern Italy, Tocco Caudio was built on a promontory ridge.  Tocco Caudio's ridge is fairly small and somewhat isolated.  This arrangement made the town easily defensible, while having ready access to ridge-top roads along which a traveller would not need to cross any rivers.  Also, as was typical with medieval development, the town is fairly compact with narrow streets.

History
In 1980 and 1981, earthquakes damaged much of the old
historical center of Tocco Caudio.  Rather than rebuild the historic town, the citizens were forced  to completely abandon it and resettle around the ridge.  Today there are essentially two Tocco Caudios: an empty ghost town and a new town above it in a location called Friuni.

People
Nicola Sala, composer and theoretist
Carlo Coppolaro, composer and critic
Carmen Valacchio, nuclear research

References

External links

Official website

Cities and towns in Campania
Ghost towns in Italy